Fatemeh is Fatemeh is a book written by Ali Shariati. In the book, Fatima Zahra the daughter of the Islamic prophet Muhammad is described as a role model for Muslim women around the world and a woman who is freedom. It was written in the pre-revolutionary era of Iran's history where there were no specific sources by which one might interpret who she was, and he assures the readers that he is giving them more than an analytical description of her personality and that it needs the criticism of the enlightened thinker. By writing this book he was to complete the work of French scholar Professor Louis Massignon.

He describes Fatima as a manifestation and a symbol of the way and an essential direction of 'Islamic thought'. He states that even in the ever changing world in which people's views towards life constantly change, as a role model Fatima can still be looked up to by women around the world.

See also
List of Shi'a books

External links
 Fatima is Fatima by Dr. Ali Shariati
 Another link, scroll to bottom

Philosophy books
Books by Ali Shariati
Iranian books
Books about Islam
Fatimah